GW Supermarket is a specialized Asian American supermarket chain in the U.S., established in New York City in 2004. The chain caters to Asian immigrants, offering Asian products in a Western supermarket-style retail operation. The President, CEO and founder is Lihui Zhang.  There are 16 locations in 7 states as of 2020.

Locations
California
Monterey Park - 421 N Atlantic Blvd
Rosemead - 8150 E Garvey Ave
Rosemead - 8815 E Valley Blvd
Rowland Heights - 18475 Colima Rd
Colorado
Broomfield - 6600 West 120th Ave.
Denver - 2200 West Alameda Ave.
Aurora - 12303 East Mississippi Ave
Georgia
Duluth - 2300 Pleasant Hill Rd
Maryland
Catonsville - 5510 Baltimore National Pike
Germantown - 19721 Fredrick Rd
Rockville - 700 Hungerford Dr
Massachusetts
Boston - 50 Herald St
Boston - 109 Lincoln St
New York
Corona - 59-16 99th St
Flushing - 137-45/61 Northern Blvd
Flushing - 144-50 Northern Blvd
Flushing - 41-79 Main Street
Texas
Houston - 9889 Bellaire Blvd, Building B
Virginia
Falls Church - 2982 Gallows Rd

Controversy
In 2011, Virginia Department of Game and Inland Fisheries staff conducted a sting of the Great Wall Supermarket in Falls Church, VA and found the store in violation of several local wildlife laws, due to the sale of live animals, including frogs, turtles, eels, largemouth bass, and crayfish. The sting resulted from a complaint from a conservationist. Two managers of the store were charged with felonies in 2012, later reduced to misdemeanors. Great Wall lawyers argued that the wildlife charges did not apply because all of the creatures on sale were commercially farmed: turtles from Oklahoma, eels from Pennsylvania, bullfrogs from the Dominican Republic, and so forth. The defense claimed that "law governing sales of live fish and other animals has not been updated to reflect advances in aquaculture, and that it is tilted against immigrants with unfamiliar cuisines and customs."

Starting in 2012, residents behind the Rockville store began submitting noise complaints to the Montgomery County Department of Environmental Protection.  As of June 1, 2015, Great Wall Supermarket has two active ongoing cases and has paid multiple fines as punishment for disturbing the peace and quiet of the adjoining neighborhood.

In popular culture
A Great Wall store appears as a location in the TV series, Constantine ("A Feast of Friends," Season 1, Episode 4)

References

External links
 Great Wall Supermarket
 www.gwmarts.com E-commerce site

Supermarkets of the United States
Chinese supermarkets
Retail companies based in New York City
Retail companies established in 2004
2004 establishments in New York City
American companies established in 2004